Platycerium bifurcatum, the elkhorn fern or common staghorn fern, is a species of fern native to Java, New Guinea and eastern Australia, in New South Wales, Queensland and on Lord Howe Island. It is a bracket epiphyte occurring in and near rainforests.

The genus name Platycerium comes from the Greek platys (flat), and ceras (horn), while the specific epithet bifurcatum means bifurcated or forked. Both names are referring to the fertile fronds.

Platycerium bifurcatum is cultivated as an ornamental plant for gardens. It has gained the Royal Horticultural Society's Award of Garden Merit.

References 

 NSW Flora Online http://plantnet.rbgsyd.nsw.gov.au/cgi-bin/NSWfl.pl?page=nswfl&lvl=sp&name=Platycerium~bifurcatum Retrieved 3 September 2009

Epiphytes
Flora of Java
Flora of Lord Howe Island
Flora of New Guinea
Flora of New South Wales
Flora of Queensland
Garden plants of Australia
House plants
Paleotropical flora
bifurcatum
Ferns of Australia
Taxa named by Antonio José Cavanilles